Austin Township may refer to:

Austin Township, Conway County, Arkansas, in Conway County, Arkansas
Austin Township, Macon County, Illinois
Austin Township, Mecosta County, Michigan 
Austin Township, Sanilac County, Michigan
Austin Township, Minnesota
Austin Township, Cass County, Missouri
Austin Township, Mountrail County, North Dakota, in Mountrail County, North Dakota

Township name disambiguation pages